Union Treaty may refer to:
 Treaty on the Creation of the Union of Soviet Socialist Republics (1922)
 New Union Treaty (1991), proposed treaty on the creation of the Union of Soviet Sovereign Republics or the Union of Sovereign States
 Treaty on European Union (1992/2007)
 Treaty of Union (1707), creating the Kingdom of Great Britain
 Treaty of Union (1790), creating the United States of Belgium

See also
 Act of Union (disambiguation)
 Treaty of Federation